Johana Edelmira Ordóñez Lucero (born December 12, 1987 in Guayaquil) is a female Ecuadorian race walker.

Career
She represented Ecuador at the 2008 Summer Olympics in Beijing, and competed for the women's 20 km race walk. Despite of the tumultuous weather, Ordóñez finished and completed the race in thirty-fifth place, with a time of 1:36:26.

Achievements

References

External links
 
NBC 2008 Olympics profile

1987 births
Living people
Ecuadorian female racewalkers
Olympic athletes of Ecuador
Athletes (track and field) at the 2008 Summer Olympics
Sportspeople from Guayaquil
World Athletics Championships athletes for Ecuador
Athletes (track and field) at the 2019 Pan American Games
Pan American Games gold medalists for Ecuador
Pan American Games medalists in athletics (track and field)
Pan American Games gold medalists in athletics (track and field)
Medalists at the 2019 Pan American Games
21st-century Ecuadorian women